Potocytosis is a type of receptor-mediated endocytosis in which small molecules are transported across the plasma membrane of a cell. The molecules are transported by caveolae (rather than clathrin-coated vesicles) and are deposited directly into the cytosol.

Like other types of receptor-mediated endocytosis, potocytosis typically begins when an extracellular ligand binds to a receptor protein on the surface of a cell, thus beginning the formation of an endocytotic vesicle. The ligand is usually of low molecular mass (e.g. vitamins), but some larger molecules (such as lipids) can also act as ligands.

Mechanism

Lipid rafts in the plasma membrane act  as membrane microdomains. They are enriched in cholesterol and sphingolipids and are involved potocytosis as the lateral compartmentalization of molecules. Caveolae are caveolin-1-enriched smooth invaginations found on these lipid rafts that contribute to transportation of molecules. Potocytosis works by taking up material into caveolae at the surface of the cell.  Glycosylphosphatidylinositol-anchored class of membrane proteins generate high concentrations of molecules. This may either be by releasing a receptor bound molecule, by converting molecules enzymatically or by releasing them from a carrier protein.

References

Cellular processes